List of World of Springfield figures and playsets is a compilation of action figures and other items related to the animated sitcom The Simpsons and provided in the World of Springfield play toy line released by Playmates Toys in December 1999. After the last of the toy line was released in December 2004, the fictional toy world eventually encompassed over 200 different figures and characters from the series, 40 interactive playsets (toy re-creations of Simpsons interior settings and town location settings within Springfield), and three non-interactive diorama town settings.

List of figures and playsets

Wave one
Release date: January 2000
 Homer Simpson - With donut, Duff Beer can, remote control and packet of "Salty Snax"
 Bart Simpson - With Santa's Little Helper, skateboard, slingshot, and spray paint can
 Lisa Simpson - With saxophone, stack of school books and Snowball
 Grampa Simpson - With removable glasses, newspaper and magnifying glass
 Mr. Burns - With money stacks and Blinky
 Krusty the Clown - With video camera, Krusty-O's, Krusty Burger, Krusty Fries and Krusty Shake

Wave one playsets
Release date: February 2000
 Simpsons Living Room with Marge and Maggie Simpson - With TV, tray of cookies and bag of groceries
 Nuclear Power Plant with Radioactive Homer — With removable hood, plate of donuts and tongs with radioactive rod

Wave two
Release date: August 2000
 Pin Pal Homer - With bowling ball and bowling bag
 Barney Gumble - With sub sandwich and beer mug
 Ned Flanders - With Bible, removable glasses, chef's hat and spatula
 Waylon Smithers - With clipboard, removable glasses and picture of Mr. Burns
 Chief Wiggum - With coffee, nightstick and donut
 Sunday Best Bart — With slingshot, Bible and Radioactive Man comic

Wave two playsets
Release date: August 2000
 Kwik-E-Mart with Apu Nahasapeemapetilon - With hot dog and Squishee
 Springfield Elementary with Principal Skinner - With American flag and clipboard

Wave three
Release date: January 2001
 Sunday Best Homer — With Bible, radio and foam hand
 Nelson Muntz - With baseball bat, spray can, water balloon and paper airplane
 Moe Szyslak - With rag, beer mug and phone
 Kamp Krusty Bart - With bow and arrow, slingshot, quiver with arrows and can of "Imitation Gruel"
 Milhouse Van Houten - With ice cream cone, Squishy, removable glasses and walkie talkie
 Otto Mann - With guitar and headphones

Wave three playsets
Release date: January 2001
 Town Hall with Mayor Quimby - With Mayor sash, briefcase of money and "Vote Quimby" sign
 Krustylu Studios with Sideshow Bob - With knife, axe, bomb, stage light, "Die Bart" license plate, cannon and movie camera.

Wave four
Release date: April 2001
 Lenny Leonard - With plate of donuts, beer mug and bowling bag
 Ralph Wiggum - With stack of books, toy rocket, keys on a chain and Radioactive Man comic
 Patty Bouvier - With video, clipboard and picture of Principal Skinner
 Groundskeeper Willie - With shovel and rake
 Casual Homer — With remote control, Duff beer, removable sunglasses and "Salty Snax"
 Itchy & Scratchy - With mallet and axe

Wave four playsets
Release date: April 2001
 Android's Dungeon Comic Book Shop with Comic Book Guy - With half-eaten cheeseburger and a shake
 Barney's Bowl-A-Rama with Pin Pal Apu - With bowling ball and bag

Wave five
Release date: July 2001
 Kent Brockman - With half-eaten donut, clipboard and microphone
 Captain McCallister — With harpoon, can of tuna and pipe.
 Bartman — With three comics, slingshot and toy rocket
 Martin Prince - With apple, clipboard, magnifying glass, stack of books and cookie tray
 Sideshow Mel — With cannon and slide whistle
 Bumblebee Man — With clipboard, bowl, spoon and video camera
Note: This is the only series to not release a playset.

Wave six
Release date: September 2001
 Dr. Hibbert — With stethoscope, medical bag, clipboard, reflex hammer and 'shot gun'
 Snake Jailbird — With handgun, bag of money and handcuffs
 Bleeding Gums Murphy — With saxophone and "Sax on the Beach" album
 Carl Carlson - With container of donuts, beer mug, donut, bowling bag and drum of radioactive waste
 Mascot Homer - With hat, number one hand and radio
 Professor John Frink - With hat, beaker, test tubes and clipboard

Wave six playsets
Release date: September 2001
 First Church of Springfield with Reverend Lovejoy - With Bible, toy train and conductor's hat
 Noiseland Arcade with Jimbo Jones — With melting ice cream sandwich, video cassette and video camera

Wave seven
Release date: December 2001
 Dolph Starbeam — With water balloon, yo-yo, comic book and Squishy
 Cletus Spuckler - With boots, moonshine, picture of Brandine and roadkill
 Edna Krabappel - With clipboard, photo frame, pen, and can of food
 Officer Lou — With nightstick, handgun, donuts in tray and handcuffs
 Hans Moleman - With magnifying glass, cane, removable glasses, clipboard and football
 Officer Marge - With night stick, gun, counterfeit jeans, clipboard and handcuffs

Wave seven playsets
Release date: December 2001
 The Simpsons Kitchen with Muumuu Homer - With hat, bag of "Much Ado about Stuffing" and weigh scale
 Krusty Burger with Pimply Faced Teen — With hat, tray, burger box, french fries and cup

Wave eight
Release date: March 2002
 Kearney Zzyzwicz — With spray can, Newton, Squishy and bat
 Sherri and Terri — With jump rope
 Ragin' Willie - With tub of grease, shotgun and flask
 Üter — With bag of chips, two pieces of candy and stack of books
 Superintendent Chalmers — With coffee cup, clipboard and phone
 Daredevil Bart - With skateboard, removable helmet and autographed picture of Lance Murdock

Wave eight playsets
Release date: March 2002
 Springfield DMV (Department of Motor Vehicles) with Selma Bouvier - With rope barrier and Jub-Jub
 Springfield Elementary Cafeteria with Lunchlady Doris — With spoon, rat and sneeze guard

Wave nine
Release date: June 2002
 Rod and Todd Flanders — With picture of Maude and board game
 Busted Krusty the Clown - With handgun, bag of money, handcuffs and number four sign
 Prison Sideshow Bob - With rake, small knife, bomb and detonator
 Sunday Best Grampa — With bottle of aspirin, fez hat, Bible, removable glasses, jar of pomade and stick of beef jerky
 Disco Stu — With album, sales chart and disco ball
 Sunday Best Lisa — With chocolate Easter bunny, removable hat and donation plate

Wave nine playsets
Release date: June 2002
 Police Station with Officer Eddie — With handcuffs, desk, nightstick and handgun
 Springfield Retirement Castle with Jasper Beardly — With potted plant, TV and cane

Wave ten
Release date: October 2002
 Stonecutter Homer - With Stonecutter book, framed certificate, removable hat and beer stein
 Wendell Borton — With banana, apple, orange, stack of books and barf bag
 Sunday Best Marge and Maggie — With purse, removable hats and Bible
 Scout Leader Flanders — With scout knife, book on knife safety, removable scout's hat and glasses, half a pine cone and flare gun
 Dr. Marvin Monroe — With foam bat, cash, clipboard, diploma and removable glasses
 Resort Smithers — With phone, removable glasses, bag of pineapples and suitcase

Wave ten playsets
Release date: October 2002
 Burns Manor with Pajamas Burns — With snow globe, red chair, grate and Bobo
 Hospital with Dr. Nick Riviera — With Buzz Cola can, open pizza box, table, rack of 4 test tubes, jar of cotton and 3 medical tools

Wave eleven
Release date: December 2002
 Larry Burns - With picture of young Mr. Burns, squash candy, Springfield sign, "Gone Drinkin'" sign and briefcase
 Plow King Barney - With cell phone, removable crown, baby bottle, Champagne bottle in ice and baseball bat
 Blue Haired Lawyer — With evidence tape, briefcase, legal pad, removable glasses, pencil and bottle of Colonel Kwik-E-Mart's Kentucky Bourbon
 Kirk Van Houten — With folder of divorce notes, tissue box, removable glasses, notepad and demo tape
 Gil Gunderson — With Dolceo computer, poker chips, foot ruler, tongs with stinky socks and bottle of seltzer
 Rainier Wolfcastle - With dumbbell, trophy, Radioactive Man script and Powersauce Bar

Wave eleven playset
Release date: December 2002
 Court Room with Judge Snyder - With American flag, gavel, law book and guilty verdict
Note: From Wave 11 to 16, only one playset was released, unlike the first ten series.

Wave twelve
Release date: April 2003
 Number One - With beer stein, Stonecutter book and paddle
 Database — With lunch tray, stack of books, removable glasses and a small horn
 Mr. Largo — With metronome, music stand, baton, chalk holder and sheet music
 Don Vittorio — With clown bicycle, seltzer bottle, folded wad of money and handgun
 Luann Van Houten — With moving boxes, tape dispenser, removable glasses and can of lighter fluid
 Mr. Plow Homer - With removable hat, key to the city, "Stock for V.P." T-shirt and stack of Mr. Plow flyers

Wave twelve playset
Release date: April 2003
 Bart's Treehouse with Military Bart - With removable helmet and sunglasses, pile of water balloons, binoculars, baton and desk

Wave thirteen
Release date: July 2003
 Helen Lovejoy — With shopping bag, "Holy Rollers" bowling bag, bowling trophy and wrestling poster for El Bombastico
 Freddy Quimby - With golf bag, golf club, surfboard and bowl of chowder
 Tuxedo Krusty - With microphone, microphone stand, coffee cup, Gabbo newspaper headline and jewel encrusted clown nose
 Legs — With switchblade, rifle, picture of the missing Skinner and a bill counter
 Princess Kashmir — With framed picture of her and Homer, camera and boombox
 Dr. Stephen Hawking - With a beer mug. Hawking's wheelchair had removable rockets, removable propeller, boxing glove and glasses

Wave thirteen playset
Release date: July 2003
 Military Antique Store with Herman Hermann — With a dirigible, warhead, two swords, rope barrier, riding crop and rifle

Wave fourteen
Release date October 2003
 Louie — With rifle, martini glass, carton of rat milk and briefcase of money
 Kilted Willie — With Loch Ness Monster doll, bagpipes, hat and tripod
 Ms. Botz - With suitcase, "Happy Little Elves" video, rope and tape
 Luigi Risotto — With open pizza box, bottle of wine and restaurant sign
 Sarcastic Man — With "World's Greatest Jacket", nightvision goggles and the "ultimate" belt
 Miss Hoover — With coffee mug, removable glasses, "Teacher's Edition" book, bag of standardized tests and "Gimme! Gimme! Gimme!" sign

Wave fourteen playset
Release date: October 2003
 Aztec Theater with McBain — With two handguns and a hand grenade

Wave fifteen
Release date: January 2004
 Manjula Nahasapeemapetilon — With Buzz Cola bottle (with nipple for the babies), a laundry basket of clothes and a heavy stack of Wuv's diapers
 The Nahasapeemapetilon Octuplets - With stroller
 Handsome Moe - With eye patch, coaster, Duff calendar (with damage from the stickers) and plot book
 Deep Space Homer - With intelligent monkey, carbon rod and packet of "Salty Snax"
 Brandine Spuckler — With boots, "Classy Lady" shirt and scarf
 Jeff Albertson - With four comics

Wave fifteen playset
Release date: January 2004
 Nuclear Power Plant Lunchroom with Frank Grimes - With small table, flask of acid, Grimes' lunch bag, sandwich, tray of donuts and a plate of mushrooms

Wave sixteen
Release date: June 2004
 Brain Freeze Bart — With Squishy, funnel and comic book
 Agnes Skinner — With picture of Skinner, keys, head pillow and locket
 Evil Homer — With pitchfork
 Artie Ziff — With prom king crown, trophy and picture of him and Marge and removable glasses
 Doug — With removable "Petting Zoo hat", computer and removable glasses
 Benjamin and Gary — With two removable "Petting Zoo" hats and removable Gary's glasses

Wave sixteen playset
Release date: September 2004
 Town Square with Jebediah Springfield — With removable head of Jebediah's statue and backpack

Toyfare exclusives
Release date: October 2000
 Radioactive Glow-In-The-Dark Homer — With removable hood, glow in the dark plate of donuts and tongs
Release date: July 2001
 Pin Pal Burns — With bowling ball and bag
Release date: October 2001
 Boxing Homer — With two boxing gloves
Release date: December 2001
 Convention Comic Book Guy — With a comic
Release date: December 2001
 Pin Pal Moe — With bowling ball and bag

Toys-R-Us exclusives
Release date: September 2000
 Treehouse of Horror 1 Springfield Cemetery with Devil Flanders, Fly Bart, Vampire Burns, and Ape Homer - With pitchfork, removable Flanders's glasses and evil Krusty doll
Release date: September 2001
 Treehouse of Horror 2 Alien Spaceship with Spaceship Homer, Kang and Kodos - With book for How to cook for humans and Space probe
Release date: August 2002
 Treehouse of Horror 3 Ironic Punishment with Dream Invader Willie, Witch Marge, Hugo Simpson, and Donut Head Homer - With donut, broom, rake and human parts in a tub
Release date: September 2003
 Treehouse of Horror 4 Underground Lair with Stretch Dude Bart, Lucy Lawless as Xena, Clobber Girl Lisa, and The Collector Comic Book Guy — With the Collector's ray gun
Release date: August 2002
 Barney's Bowl-A-Rama with Bowling Marge and Jacques - With two bowling balls and a bowling bag
Release date: October 2003
 Simpson's Rumpus Room with Original Homer, Marge, Bart, Lisa, and Maggie - With boxing gloves, ball, mallet and punching bag
Release date: November 2001
 Simpson's Christmas with Christmas Homer, Marge, Bart, Lisa, and Maggie on Santa's Little Helper - With piano
Release date: September 2002
 Main Street with Crazy Old Man and Squeaky Voiced Teen — With removable hat and cane
Release date: April 2002
 Lurleen Lumpkin's Trailer with Colonel Homer and Lurleen Lumpkin - With removable Colonel Homer's hat and guitar
Release date: November 2002
 New Years Town Square with New Year Homer, Marge, Bart, Lisa, and Maggie — With large noise maker, small noise maker, martini glass, party hooter, Flagpole, 2003 flag, horn and star
Release date: September 2003
 The Be Sharps Centennial with Dr. Dolittle Wiggum — With microphone

EB Games exclusives
Release date: September 2001
 Lunar Base with Rainier Wolfcastle as Radioactive Man and Milhouse as Fallout Boy - With barrel of acid, script and flag
Release date: October 2002
 KBBL Radio Station with Bill and Marty — With two headphones and two microphones
Release date: October 2003
 The Next Century with Future Burns, Future Smithers, Bobo Smitherz — With ragged Bobo and two removable Smithers's glasses
Release date: April 2002
 High School Prom with Young Homer and Marge — With corsage
Release date: January 2003
 Moe's Tavern with Duffman — With beer glass

Mail away
Release date: Late 2002
 Be Sharp Homer - With cane and removable straw hat
Release date: Early 2003
 Be Sharp Apu - With cane and removable straw hat
Release date: May 2003
 Be Sharp Skinner - With cane and removable straw hat
Release date: Late 2003
 Be Sharp Barney - With cane and removable straw hat
Release date: Late 2003
 Stonecutter Moe - With beer stein, paddle and damaged certificate
Release date: Early 2004
 Stonecutter Lenny - With paddle, book and beer stein
Release date: October 2002
 Llewellyn Sinclair (Voiced by Jon Lovitz) - With pen, newspaper review, "Ayn Rand School for Tots" and script
Release date: October 2002
 Cooder (Voiced by Jim Varney) - With tackle box, money bundles, rings for the ring toss and oversized comb

Celebrity Voices wave one
Release date: February 2002
 Troy McClure (Voiced by Phil Hartman) - With two videos, phone, clipboard and microphone
 Herbert Powell (Voiced by Danny DeVito) - With cell phone, clipboard, briefcase and drawing board with plans for the baby translator
 Fat Tony (Voiced by Joe Mantegna) - With handgun, bat, cigar and bundle of money

Celebrity Voices wave two
Release date: June 2002
 Lionel Hutz (Voiced by Phil Hartman) - With diploma, briefcase, monkey statue and business card
 Brad Goodman (Voiced by Albert Brooks) - With cup, book, can, seminar sign and video tape

Celebrity Voices wave three
Release date: October 2002
 Hank Scorpio (Voiced by Albert Brooks) - With a grenade, walkie-talkie and flame-thrower
This item was available as part of Wave Ten

Dioramas
Release date: July 2003
 Outside Simpsons House with Homer, Marge, and Maggie Simpson
 Outside Kwik-E-Mart with Grampa Simpson & Apu
 Outside Krustylu Studios with Krusty The Clown & Milhouse

Re-releases
Release date: April 2003
 Moe Szyslak
 Charles Montgomery Burns

References

External links
 World of Springfield

World of Simpsons
Action figures
Figures